Jesus T. Iguel (born 2 October 1989) is a Northern Mariana Islander sprinter. He competed in the 100 metres event at the 2013 World Championships in Athletics.

References

1989 births
Living people
Northern Mariana Islands male sprinters
Place of birth missing (living people)
World Athletics Championships athletes for the Northern Mariana Islands